Moynaq or also Muynak district is a district of Karakalpakstan in Uzbekistan. The capital lies at the city Moynaq.

There is one city Moynaq and seven rural communities: Bozataw, Qazaqdárya, Mádeli, Tikózek, Ushsay, Hákim-ata, Qizil jar.

References

Karakalpakstan
Districts of Uzbekistan